Limnophila macrocera is a species of limoniid crane fly in the family Limoniidae.

Subspecies
These two subspecies belong to the species Limnophila macrocera:
 Limnophila macrocera macrocera (Say, 1823)
 Limnophila macrocera suffusa Alexander, 1927

References

Limoniidae
Articles created by Qbugbot
Insects described in 1823